One Nite Alone... is the twenty-fifth studio album by American recording artist Prince. It was released on May 14, 2002 by NPG Records.

Background
It features him singing and accompanying himself on piano, making only occasional use of other instruments. It includes a cover of the Joni Mitchell classic, "A Case of You", retitled "A Case of U". Mitchell receives special thanks in the liner notes. It is also the first Prince album not to chart. One song that caused some controversy amongst fans is "Avalanche", which describes Abraham Lincoln as a racist.

One Nite Alone... was given to members of the NPG Music Club, separately and included as a gift with his One Nite Alone...Live box set.  It was never sold in stores, but bootlegs are available. For many years the primary way to hear the album was through MP3 file-sharing, and original CD copies are quite rare; in 2015, the album was released through Tidal. On May 29, 2020, the album was released on vinyl and CD.

Track listing
All songs written by Prince, except "A Case of U" by Joni Mitchell.

Personnel
 Prince – all vocals and instruments except where noted
 John Blackwell – drums on tracks 3 and 4
 Ambient singing – Prince's doves, Divinity and Majesty
 Scottie Baldwin – One Nite Alone...Live!

Notes
 "One Nite Alone", "U're Gonna C Me", "Here on Earth", "A Case of U", and "Pearls B4 the Swine" were initially released through the NPG Music Club in 2001
 "U're Gonna C Me" was re-recorded with new instrumentation for MPLSound.
 "A Case of U" is dedicated to the memory of John L. Nelson, Prince's father.

References

2002 albums
Prince (musician) albums
Albums produced by Prince (musician)
NPG Records albums